Atagema is a genus of sea slugs, specifically dorid nudibranchs. They are marine gastropod molluscs in the family Discodorididae.

Species
Species so far described in this genus include:

 Atagema alba (O'Donoghue, 1927) hunchback doris 
 Atagema albata (Burn, 1962)
 Atagema anceps (Bergh, 1890)
 Atagema boucheti Valdés & Gosliner, 2001
 Atagema browni T. E. Thompson, 1980
 Atagema carinata (Quoy & Gaimard, 1832) - type species
 Atagema echinata (Pease, 1860) 
 Atagema gibba Pruvot-Fol, 1951
 Atagema intecta (Kelaart, 1858)
 Atagema molesta (M. C. Miller, 1989)
 Atagema notacristata Camacho-Garcia & Gosliner, 2008
 Atagema ornata (Ehrenberg, 1831)
 Atagema osseosa  Kelaart, 1859
 Atagema rugosa Pruvot-Fol, 1951 rugby-ball dorid, spined dorid
 Atagema scabriuscula (Pease, 1860)
 Atagema sobanovae (Innabi et al., 2023)
 Atagema spinosa (Risbec, 1928)
Atagema spongiosa  (Kelaart, 1858)
 Atagema triphylla (Bergh, 1892)
 Atagema tristis (Alder & Hancock, 1864)
Species inquerenda
 Atagema africana Pruvot-Fol, 1953 
synonyms
 Atagema hispida (d'Orbigny, 1834): synonym of Diaulula hispida (d'Orbigny, 1834)
 Atagema prea (Ev. Marcus & Er. Marcus, 1967) is a synonym of Sclerodoris prea  (Ev. Marcus & Er. Marcus, 1967)
 Atagema quadrimaculata Collier, 1963: synonym of Atagema alba (O'Donoghue, 1927)

References

Discodorididae
Taxa named by John Edward Gray
Gastropod genera